Graemsay is an island in the western approaches to Scapa Flow, in the Orkney Islands of Scotland. The island has two lighthouses. Graemsay lies within the parish of Stromness.

Geography and geology
Graemsay lies between Hoy and Stromness on Mainland Orkney, separated from the Mainland by Clestrain Sound.

The island's geology is Old Red Sandstone of the Devonian period, with two volcanic faults. On the north coast there is granite-schist, a great rarity in Orkney.

Graemsay is surrounded by strong tidal races, known locally as roosts.

Graemsay is sometimes referred to locally, as 'Orkney's green isle' due to its lush green vegetation cover.

Wildlife
Birds include oystercatchers, ringed plovers, redshank and curlew. Parts of the island are largely undeveloped and are a haven for wild plants.

History
As with many other Orkney Islands, there is a connection to the Celtic Church, possibly a pre-Norse one. There are the remains of two early churches, dedicated to St Bride and to St Columba., who are both saints of Irish origin.

The island has two lighthouses, Hoy High (NE) and Hoy Low (NW), both built in 1851 by Alan Stevenson for the 19th-century herring industry.

At the Point of Oxan in the far north west, in Burra Sound, are block ships, which were scuttled deliberately during World War II. This is a common feature of the straits and former straits around Scapa Flow. A Coastal Defence Battery also sits at the point of Oxan, built in 1944, and guarding the western entrance to Scapa Flow, until the end of World War II.

Graemsay primary school was built in 1876 and once had a peak enrollment of 60 pupils. In the late 1990s the school had four staff to just one pupil, making it the most expensive state school in the United Kingdom. The school closed in 1996. Today, the island's children travel daily by boat to school in Stromness on the ferry MV Graemsay.

Lighthouses

Two lighthouses are present on Graemsay: Hoy Sound Low and Hoy Sound High located at the extremities of the northern side of the island. The lights were built in 1851 on project by Alan Stevenson; both are cylindrical tower with balcony and lantern, even if of different heights, white painted with black lantern and the typical ochre trims.

The two Range lighthouses direct the ships towards the Hoy Sound from the Atlantic.

See also

 List of islands of Scotland
 List of lighthouses in Scotland
 List of Northern Lighthouse Board lighthouses

References

Book about the History of Graemsay
 the orcadian bookshop

External links
 Run by the current residents of Hoy High Lighthouse, and attempts to give a flavour of life today on Graemsay
 The largest building, Sandside House, has been renovated and this web site describes the property and the island.
 Contains information about all Graemsay families
 Northern Lighthouse Board

Islands of the Orkney Islands